Napoleon II (Napoléon François Joseph Charles Bonaparte; 20 March 181122 July 1832) was the disputed Emperor of the French for a few weeks in 1815. The son of Emperor Napoleon I and Marie Louise of Austria, he had been Prince Imperial of France and King of Rome since birth.  After the fall of his father, he lived the rest of his life in Vienna and was known in the Austrian court as Franz, Duke of Reichstadt  for his adult life (from the German version of his second given name, along with a title he was granted by the Austrian emperor in 1818).  He was posthumously given the nickname L'Aiglon ("the Eaglet") after the popular Edmond Rostand play, L'Aiglon.

When Napoleon I tried to abdicate on 4 April 1814, he said that his son would rule as emperor. However, the coalition victors refused to acknowledge his son as successor, and Napoleon I was forced to abdicate unconditionally some days later. Although Napoleon II never actually ruled France, he was briefly the titular Emperor of the French after the second fall of his father.  He lived most of his life in Vienna and died of tuberculosis at the age of 21.

His cousin, Louis-Napoléon Bonaparte, founded the Second French Empire in 1852 and ruled as Emperor Napoleon III.

Biography

Birth
Napoleon ll was born on 20 March 1811, at the Tuileries Palace, the son of Emperor Napoleon I and Empress Marie Louise. On the same day he underwent ondoyé (a traditional French ceremony which is considered a preliminary, brief baptism) by Joseph Fesch with his full name of Napoleon François Charles Joseph.
The baptism, inspired by the baptismal ceremony of Louis, Grand Dauphin of France, was held on 9 June 1811 in Notre Dame de Paris. Karl Philipp, Prince of Schwarzenberg, Austrian ambassador to France, wrote of the baptism:

He was put in the care of Louise Charlotte Françoise de Montesquiou, a descendant of François-Michel le Tellier, Marquis de Louvois, who was named Governess of the Children of France. Affectionate and intelligent, the governess assembled a considerable collection of books intended to give the infant a strong grounding in religion, philosophy, and military matters.

Succession rights
As the only legitimate son of Napoleon I, he was already constitutionally the Prince Imperial and heir apparent, but the Emperor also gave his son the style of King of Rome. Three years later, the First French Empire collapsed. Napoleon I saw his second wife and their son for the last time on 24 January 1814. On 4 April 1814, he abdicated in favour of his three-year-old son after the Six Days' Campaign and the Battle of Paris. The child became Emperor of the French under the regnal name of Napoleon II. However, on 6 April 1814, Napoleon I fully abdicated and renounced not only his own rights to the French throne, but also those of his descendants. The Treaty of Fontainebleau in 1814 gave the child the right to use the title of Prince of Parma, of Placentia, and of Guastalla, and his mother was styled the Duchess of Parma, of Placentia, and of Guastalla.

Reign
On 29 March 1814, Marie Louise, accompanied by her entourage, left the Tuileries Palace with her son. Their first stop was the Château de Rambouillet; then, fearing the advancing enemy troops, they continued on to the Château de Blois. On 13 April, with her entourage much diminished, Marie Louise and her three-year-old son were back in Rambouillet, where they met her father, the Emperor Francis I of Austria, and the Emperor Alexander I of Russia. On 23 April, escorted by an Austrian regiment, mother and son left Rambouillet and France forever, for their exile in Austria.

In 1815, after his resurgence and his defeat at Waterloo, Napoleon I abdicated for the second time in favour of his four-year-old son, whom he had not seen since his exile to Elba. The day after Napoleon's abdication, a Commission of Government of five members took the rule of France, awaiting the return of the Bourbon King Louis XVIII, who was in Le Cateau-Cambrésis. The Commission held power for two weeks, but never formally summoned Napoleon II as Emperor or appointed a regent. The entrance of the Allies into Paris on 7 July brought a rapid end to his supporters' wishes. Napoleon II was residing in Austria with his mother.

The next Bonaparte to ascend the throne of France, in 1852, would be Louis-Napoleon, the son of Napoleon's brother Louis I, King of Holland. He took the regnal name of Napoleon III.

Life in Austria

From the spring of 1814 onwards, the young Napoleon lived in Austria and was known as "Franz", a German language cognate of his second given name, François. In 1818, he was awarded the title of Duke of Reichstadt by his maternal grandfather, Emperor Francis. He was educated by a staff of military tutors and developed a passion for soldiering, dressing in a miniature uniform like his father's and performing maneuvers in the palace. At the age of 8, it was apparent to his tutors that he had chosen his career.

By 1820, Napoleon had completed his elementary studies and begun his military training, learning German, Italian and mathematics as well as receiving advanced physical training. His official army career began at age 12, in 1823, when he was made a cadet in the Austrian Army. Accounts from his tutors describe Napoleon as intelligent, serious and focused. Additionally, he was a very tall young man: he had grown to nearly 6 feet by the time he was 17.

In 1822 the Four Sergeants of La Rochelle were put to death for attempting to return Napoleon II to the throne, although it is unclear to what extent they were committed Bonapartists. There is no evidence that Napoleon II endorsed the insurrection.

His budding military career gave some concern and fascination to the monarchies of Europe and French leaders over his possible return to France. However, he was allowed to play no political role and instead was used by Austrian Chancellor Klemens von Metternich in bargaining with France to gain advantage for Austria. Fearful of anyone in the Bonaparte family regaining political power, Metternich even rejected a request for Franz to move to a warmer climate in Italy. He received another rejection when his grandfather refused to allow him to join the army traveling to Italy to put down a rebellion.

Upon the death of his stepfather, Adam Albert von Neipperg, and the revelation that his mother had borne two illegitimate children to Neipperg prior to their marriage, Franz grew distant from his mother and felt that his Austrian family were holding him back to avoid political controversy. He said to his friend, Anton von Prokesch-Osten, "If Josephine had been my mother, my father would not have been buried at Saint Helena, and I should not be at Vienna. My mother is kind but weak; she was not the wife my father deserved".

Death

In 1831, Franz was given command of an Austrian battalion, but he never got the chance to serve in any meaningful capacity. In 1832, he caught pneumonia and was bedridden for several months. His poor health eventually overtook him and on 22 July 1832 Franz died of tuberculosis at Schönbrunn Palace in Vienna. He had no children; thus the Napoleonic claim to the throne of France passed to his cousin, Louis-Napoléon Bonaparte, who later founded and reigned over the Second French Empire, styling himself Napoleon III.

Disposition of his remains

On 15 December 1940, Adolf Hitler ordered the remains of Napoleon II to be transferred from Vienna to the dome of Les Invalides in Paris. The remains of Napoleon I had been returned to France in December 1840, at the time of the July Monarchy. In December 1969, the remains of Napoleon II were moved underground to the cella of Napoleon's tomb.

While most of his remains were transferred to Paris in 1940, his heart and intestines remained in Vienna, which is traditional for members of the Habsburg family. His heart is in Urn 42 of the Herzgruft ('Heart Crypt'), and his viscera are in Urn 76 of the Ducal Crypt.

Legacy
 In 1900, Edmond Rostand wrote a play, L'Aiglon, about his life. 
 Serbian composer Petar Stojanović composed the operetta Napoleon II: Herzog von Reichstadt, which premiered in Vienna in the 1920s. 
 Victor Tourjansky directed a French-language film titled L'Aiglon in 1931, and he also directed a separate German-language version.
 Arthur Honegger and Jacques Ibert collaborated on an opera, L'Aiglon, which premiered in 1937. 
 The journalist Henri Rochefort joked that Napoleon II, having never really governed, was France's best leader, since he brought no war, taxes or tyranny.
He was noted for his friendship with Sophie, a Bavarian princess of the House of Wittelsbach. Intelligent, ambitious and strong-willed, Sophie had little in common with her husband Franz Karl, the brother of Napoleon II's mother, Empress Marie Louise. There were rumors of a love affair between Sophie and Napoleon II, as well as the possibility that Sophie's second son, Maximilian I of Mexico, born in 1832, was the result issue of the affair.

Honours
 : Knight Grand Cross of the Order of Saint Stephen, 1811
  First French Empire: Grand Eagle of the Legion of Honour
  Kingdom of Italy: Knight of the Order of the Iron Crown, 1st Class
 : Knight Grand Cross of the Sacred Military Constantinian Order of Saint George

Coats of arms

See also
 Cradle of the King of Rome
 Palace of the King of Rome

References

Sources
 Welschinger, Le roi de Rome, 1811–32, (Paris, 1897)
 Wertheimer, The Duke of Reichstadt, (London, 1905)

External links
 German description of the arms of the Duke of Reichstadt, circa 1830
 

|-

|-

|-

|-

1811 births
1832 deaths
19th-century monarchs of France
19th-century Princes of Andorra
19th-century Kings of the Romans
19th-century deaths from tuberculosis
House of Bonaparte
French emperors
Princes of Andorra
Princes of France (Bonaparte)
Bonapartist pretenders to the French throne
First French Empire
Grand Croix of the Légion d'honneur
Commandeurs of the Ordre des Palmes Académiques
Knights of the Golden Fleece
Grand Crosses of the Order of Saint Stephen of Hungary
Roman Catholic monarchs
Nobility from Paris
Monarchs deposed as children
Tuberculosis deaths in Austria
Burials at St. Stephen's Cathedral, Vienna
Royal reburials
Sons of emperors
Sons of kings
Child pretenders